María Elena Holly (née Santiago; born December 20, 1932) is the widow of American rock and roll pioneer Buddy Holly. As a receptionist at Peermusic, she met with Holly and his band the Crickets on June 19, 1958, and Holly proposed to her after five hours on their first date. Less than two months later, the couple married on August 15, 1958, in Lubbock, Texas. On February 3, 1959, Buddy Holly died in a plane crash along with fellow musicians Ritchie Valens and The Big Bopper near Clear Lake, Iowa. She suffered a miscarriage the following day and did not attend Holly's funeral.

In the following years, María Elena Holly remarried Puerto Rican government official Joe Diaz, with whom she had three children. In the 1978 film The Buddy Holly Story, she is portrayed by actress Maria Richwine. As Buddy Holly's widow, she owns the rights to his name, image, trademarks, and other intellectual property. In 2010, Santiago-Holly co-founded The Buddy Holly Educational Foundation with Peter Bradley.

Early life
María Elena Santiago was born in San Juan, Puerto Rico. María Elena's mother died when she was 6 years old. In 1953, her father sent her to live with her aunt (Provi Garcia) in New York City. Santiago worked as a receptionist for music publisher Peermusic.

Marriage to Buddy Holly
As a receptionist at Peermusic, Maria Elena is believed to have met musician Buddy Holly in August 1957 when as rising stars he and the Crickets first visited Peer Southern Music in the Brill Building at 1619 Broadway to meet their publishing manager Murray Deutch, who was Maria's boss. On June 19, 1958, just before recording a cover of the Bobby Darin song "Early in the Morning" in New York's Pythian Temple, Holly asked her out on a date. Santiago had never been out on a date and told Holly he would have to ask her aunt for permission, which he received promptly. Five hours into their first date, Buddy handed a rose to Maria and asked her to marry him.

On August 15, 1958, less than two months after their first date, she married Holly at Tabernacle Baptist Church in his hometown of Lubbock, Texas. They settled down in Lubbock until Buddy broke up with the Crickets, and they moved to New York. Santiago-Holly went on one tour (October 1958) with her husband and took on promotional duties. Buddy Holly also formed the Maria Music publishing company with which "Stay Close to Me" was filed. Holly produced Lou Giordano's version of the song, which was issued on Brunswick 55115 on January 27, 1959.

In the early morning hours of February 3, 1959, Buddy Holly was on tour when he and fellow musicians Ritchie Valens and The Big Bopper died in an airplane crash along with pilot Roger Peterson near Clear Lake, Iowa. At the time, Holly and Santiago had been married for only six months, and she learned of his death from the reports on television. As a result of psychological trauma from the incident, Santiago miscarried with her husband's child on February 4. Her husband was interred in Lubbock.

Santiago-Holly did not attend the funeral and has never visited the grave site. In a February 7, 1959, interview with the Lubbock Avalanche-Journal, she said, "In a way, I blame myself. I was not feeling well when he left. I was two weeks pregnant, and I wanted Buddy to stay with me, but he had scheduled that tour. It was the only time I wasn't with him. And I blame myself because I know that, if only I had gone along, Buddy never would have gotten into that airplane."

Following the miscarriage suffered by Santiago-Holly and the circumstances in which she was informed of his death, a policy was later adopted by authorities not to disclose victims' names until after their families have been informed.

Later years
Santiago-Holly later married Joe Diaz, a Puerto Rican government official. Together, they had three children. Now divorced, she is a grandmother living in Dallas, Texas, and promotes her first husband's legacy. In 1989, The Smithereens paid honor to her with the song "Maria Elena" on their album 11. Actress Maria Richwine played Santiago-Holly's role in the 1978 movie The Buddy Holly Story. Jill Hennessy portrayed her in the Broadway production of Buddy: The Buddy Holly Story.

In 2008, Santiago-Holly threatened legal action against Peggy Sue Gerron, the subject of the song "Peggy Sue", after the publication of Gerron's autobiography Whatever Happened to Peggy Sue?

While visiting New York City in May 2008, Santiago-Holly visited Washington Square Park, where Holly often played his guitar. She observed musicians singing there, and later told the Avalanche-Journal: "I gave one musician $9 because 9 was Buddy's favorite number." She also visited the apartment building where she and Holly had lived. Santiago-Holly remarked it was the first time she had been back to the building since Holly's death.

The Buddy Holly Educational Foundation
In 2010, Santiago-Holly co-founded, with Peter Bradley, the Buddy Holly Educational Foundation. The foundation is a charitable corporation whose mission is to keep Buddy Holly's legacy alive by providing musical education to new generations regardless of income, ethnicity or educational limitations. Among the areas in the musical education provided are songwriting, production, arranging, orchestration and performance education. The Buddy Holly Educational Foundation co-hosts worldwide songwriting retreats with Chris Difford. They are organized by Peter Bradley Jr, board Director of the Buddy Holly Educational Foundation.

See also

 List of Puerto Ricans

References

External links
 
 
 

1932 births
Living people
Buddy Holly
People from San Juan, Puerto Rico
Puerto Rican businesspeople